Vincent Lopez (born January 22, 1949), nicknamed Mad Dog, is an American drummer. Between 1968 and 1974 Lopez backed Bruce Springsteen in several bands, including Steel Mill and the E Street Band. He also played on Springsteen's first two albums, Greetings from Asbury Park, N.J. and The Wild, the Innocent and the E Street Shuffle. Both during and after his time with the E Street Band, Lopez played drums with numerous Jersey Shore bands.

In April 2014, Lopez was inducted by Bruce Springsteen into the Rock and Roll Hall of Fame as a member of the E Street Band and is now an ambassador for the Rock Hall.

Early years
Lopez grew up in Neptune Township, New Jersey where he attended Neptune High School with both Garry Tallent and Southside Johnny. From 1956 to 1962 he played the soprano valve bugle in a Drum and Bugle Corps. Then as a teenager he taught himself the drums and began playing with Buzzy Lubinsky, a drummer/DJ based in Asbury Park, New Jersey. Lubinsky's father was Herman Lubinsky, owner of Savoy Records in Newark. Lubinsky would subsequently act as a mentor for the young Lopez. From 1964, with encouragement from Lubinsky, he began to try out for local bands. After a failed audition for The Storytellers, a band which included Bill Chinnock and Danny Federici, he successfully auditioned for The Blazers led by Sonny Kenn. They subsequently became Sonny & The Sounds and then Sonny & The Starfires. After graduating from high school in 1967, he continued to play with several local bands. These included the Downtown Tangiers Band, with Federici, Chinnock and Garry Tallent and Moment of Truth with Tallent, Tom Worieo, and Ricky DeSarno (guitars).
 DeSarno and Lopez would become regular collaborators after Lopez left the E Street Band.
In 1970 Lopez worked at Carvers boatyard in Point Pleasant, New Jersey.

The Upstage years
In 1968 The Upstage Club was opened at 702 Cookman Avenue in Asbury Park, New Jersey. The club had subsequently played a central role in the history of both Bruce Springsteen and the E Street Band and Southside Johnny & The Asbury Jukes.  In February 1969 Springsteen and Lopez got together with Danny Federici and Vinnie Roslin at The Upstage and formed a new band. Vini got in touch with Carl “Tinker” West and he became the band's manager and mentor. They initially played as Child but in November 1969 changed their name to Steel Mill to avoid confusion with another band. Springsteen and Lopez had already met each other on several occasions. On April 22, 1966 they both played with their respective bands, The Castiles and Sonny & The Starfires, in a battle of the bands competition at the Matawan-Keyport Roller Drome in Matawan, New Jersey. During the early 1970s Lopez and Springsteen would go on to play together in several short-lived bands based out of the Upstage. These included Bruce Springsteen & The Friendly Enemies, The Sundance Blues Band, Dr. Zoom & The Sonic Boom Band and The Bruce Springsteen Band. Most of these bands included a core membership of Danny Federici, David Sancious, Garry Tallent, Steve Van Zandt and Southside Johnny. The latter band also included Delores Holmes and Barbara Dinkins. Dinkins would be replaced by Francine Daniels.

E Street Band
In 1972, after Bruce Springsteen signed a recording contract with Columbia Records, he returned to The Upstage to recruit a band to record and then tour in support of his debut album, Greetings from Asbury Park, N.J.. Together with Danny Federici, Garry Tallent, Clarence Clemons and David Sancious, Lopez was a founding member of what eventually became the E Street Band. It was also around this time that Clive Davis first gave Lopez his  "Mad Dog" nickname. By 1973 they had recorded a second album with Springsteen, The Wild, the Innocent and the E Street Shuffle. Other recordings from this era featuring Lopez would later be released on  Tracks and 18 Tracks. Lopez would leave the band in controversial circumstances.  A NY Times article from May 1, 2005 said he had gotten into a fight with Steve Appel, the band's Road Manager and brother of then Manager Mike Appel.

Reunions with Springsteen
However this was not the last occasion that Lopez backed Springsteen in concert. On September 8, 1974 at The Stone Pony, following a set by the Blackberry Booze Band, Springsteen accompanied by Lopez and Garry Tallent joined Southside Johnny for several songs, including a rendition of "Twist and Shout".  Shortly afterwards the Blackberry Booze Band, led by Southside and Steve Van Zandt, would become Southside Johnny & The Asbury Jukes. On January 18, 1989, Lopez, together with George Theiss, the leader of The Castiles, an early Springsteen band, and Patti Scialfa, was one of Springsteen's guests at the 4th Annual Rock and Roll Hall of Fame dinner at the Waldorf Astoria Hotel. Backstreets, a Springsteen fanzine, reported that Springsteen invited Lopez on stage during the jam session and that he subsequently backed Little Richard, Stevie Wonder, Mick Jagger and Keith Richards as well as Springsteen himself during a performance of Roy Orbison's "Crying". On July 21, 2003, at the Giants Stadium, during The Rising Tour, Lopez also made a guest appearance, playing on "Spirit in the Night". Another guest performance with the E Street band was on October 20, 2009, where he backed Springsteen at the Wachovia Spectrum in Philadelphia during "Spirit in the Night".
On September 19, 2012, Lopez made a guest appearance during Springsteen's first concert at the new MetLife Stadium, playing on "The E Street Shuffle". On April 10, 2014, Lopez was inducted as a member of the E Street Band into the Rock and Roll Hall of Fame and performed three songs with the band during the ceremony. Lopez made a guest appearance in 2016 during a show on The River Tour 2016 in Philadelphia on September 9. 2016, where he performed on "It's Hard to Be a Saint in the City" and "Spirit in the Night".

The Lord Gunner Group
During the 1970s Lopez played with The Lord Gunner Group, one of the Jersey Shore's most popular unsigned groups. The power rock band was led by Lance Larson (lead vocals) and Ricky DeSarno (lead guitar). In 1974 Lopez, Larson and DeSarno, together with John Luraschi (bass), had played together in Cold Blast and Steel.  Luraschi was an Upstage veteran and had been a fringe member of Dr. Zoom. Together with Southside Johnny & The Asbury Jukes, Cold Blast and Steel became one of the top two performing bands in New Jersey. However, by 1975 Lopez was leading his own band, Maddog & The Shakes, which featured Vinnie Roslin and DeSarno. The Shakes based their sound on Motown and Memphis and have been described as "one of the great unsigned Asbury Park bands of the mid-1970s". In 1977 Lopez briefly moved to Maine where he reunited with Bill Chinnock and played on the latter's Badlands album.

Meanwhile, back on the Jersey Shore, Larsen and DeSarno had formed The Lord Gunner Group. Lopez was the second of three notable drummers to play with the band. He succeeded Ernest Carter, who had earlier replaced Lopez in the E Street Band. When he left the band Lopez was replaced by Tico Torres. The band played original music and high-impact rock at their live shows. They became the house band at The Stone Pony and opened for acts such as David Johansen, Sly & The Family Stone and John Cafferty. They later played larger venues throughout the Eastern Seaboard and their opening acts included The Smithereens and Jon Bon Jovi and The Wild Ones. Although Lord Gunner never recorded an album of its own they did feature on the compilation The Sounds of Asbury Park. Lord Gunner had several opportunities to be signed, but another unfortunate incident involving Lopez and a manager ended one of its best chances. After self-financing and self-promoting a showcase at a club for several A&R representatives, Larson and Lopez discovered that, without consulting them, their manager had also booked an opening band, with the intention of trying to get them signed. An angry Lopez had to be escorted from the club by police. Larson played a few songs, then calmly approached the microphone to ask all of the A&R reps to get up out of the first few rows and let the band's friends and fans sit down in their places. All the reps then left the club and Lord Gunner lost their shot at a deal.

Steel Mill Retro
After leaving The Lord Gunner Group, Lopez went on to play with several Jersey Shore bands led by Paul Whistler, formerly of the Blackberry Booze Band. These included The Wheels and The Asbury All-Stars. The latter band also featured Mike Scialfa, the brother of Patti Scialfa. Then, during the mid-1980s he played in both Opus I and The Acme Boogie Company with vocalist-guitarist-bassist Sam Cooper. In 1987, he reunited with Vinnie Roslin in J.P. Gotrock. By 1989, Lopez was playing with Live Bait, a band led by singer-songwriter Laura Crisci. In addition to original Crisci songs, this band included two early Springsteen songs in its set list, "Goin' Back To Georgia", from the Steel Mill era, and "Cowboys of the Sea", which had been performed by The Bruce Springsteen Band. Lopez took lead vocals on both songs. During the 1990s, Lopez led his own bar band, Maddog & The Disco Rejects. Members of the band included Sam Cooper, John Luraschi, Ricky DeSarno and Bob Alfano, who had played keyboards with two early Springsteen bands, The Castiles and Earth. This band also included early Springsteen songs in its set list.

By 2002, Lopez was playing with Cold Blast and Steel, which also included John Luraschi and Ricky DeSarno. Its setlists included an original song called "Whatever Happened to Asbury Park?", written by Steve Clark, and another Steel Mill song, "The Judge". By 2004, this band had developed into Steel Mill Retro, led by Lopez, and also featuring Ricky DeSarno. The band has performed and recorded original Springsteen songs from the Steel Mill era, as well as serve as mentor to emerging artists such as The Ries Brothers. In 2007, they released The Dead Sea Chronicles, an album that features Steel Mill-era songs. In September 2008, Steel Mill Retro played at a Springsteen fan convention in Rotterdam, organized by the Dutch fan club Roulette. They were accompanied to the convention by Carl "Tinker" West, the original manager of Steel Mill. They have since released another CD called All Man the Guns for America. The lineup currently includes Lopez on drums, John Galella on guitar, Ed Piersanti on bass, Steve Lusardi on B3 and Adam Glenn on keys.

Personal life
Lopez now lives in Hamilton, New Jersey with his fiancée Dawn Bearce. He has a daughter Liz, who is an accountant, by his late wife Laurel, who died in 2004.

Away from his music career, Lopez has worked as a golf caddy for Mark McCormick for over 25 years. They have played in The US Open in 2012 and The US Senior Open in 2017.

Discography

Steel Mill Retro, now a two CD set!
 The Dead Sea Chronicles (2005)
 All Man the Guns for America (2007) 
Bruce Springsteen
 Greetings from Asbury Park, N.J. (1973)
 The Wild, the Innocent and the E Street Shuffle (1973)
 Tracks (1998)
 18 Tracks (1999)
 The Essential Bruce Springsteen (2003)
Bill Chinnock
 Badlands (1978)
Selected others
  Various artists: The Sounds Of Asbury Park (as a member of The Acme Boogie Company) (1980)

References

1949 births
Living people
American male drummers
E Street Band members
Musicians from New Jersey
Jersey Shore musicians
People from Jackson Township, New Jersey
People from Neptune Township, New Jersey
Neptune High School alumni
20th-century American drummers
Steel Mill members